Creaming may refer to:

 Creaming (chemistry), a process of separation of an emulsion
 Creaming (food), several different culinary processes

See also
Cream (disambiguation)